Kuopion Palloseura (or KuPS) is a Finnish football club, based in the ninth most populated city of Finland, Kuopio. KuPS plays in Finland's Premier League, Veikkausliiga.

KuPS has won the Finnish championship six times, the Finnish Cup 4 times and the Finnish League Cup once. KuPS also holds the Finnish club record of the most consecutive seasons in the top flight, from 1949 to 1992. The team is placed fourth in the all-time Finnish Premier League honour table.

The team plays its home matches at Savon Sanomat Areena. Until June 2005, KuPS used to play at an aged track and field stadium in Väinölänniemi, which is said to be one of the most beautiful sporting places in Finland. Väinölänniemi is a cape surrounded by a local lake, Kallavesi.

History

1923–1949 Early History

One of the first sports clubs in Kuopio to adopt football was Kuopion Reipas who made the sport an official part of their program in 1915. Reipas was a general athletic society which competed in a wide variety of sports like track and field, gymnastics, skiing as well as team sports like bandy. After the Finnish Civil War of 1918 the differing interests of the disciplines began to cause friction within the club which resulted in the club gradually breaking apart during the 1920s. Among the clubs that emerged from Reipas was KuPS, officially founded on March 16, 1923, at Kuopion Seurahuone. Ali Rautakorpi was elected as the club's first chairman. Other sports participated in by the club during its early years were pesäpallo, tennis and bandy.

The 1920s KuPS spent mostly by playing friendly games against other local clubs. First major breakthrough came in 1930 when KuPS won the Savo district championship thereby earning promotion to B-sarja, the second tier of Finnish football at the time, where they remained until 1947 when they were promoted to Mestaruussarja for the first time. KuPS's first stint in the Finnish top division lasted only a single season, but they were promoted again in 1949 and this time remained in the top division for 44 seasons.

Season 2005

KuPS returned to the top flight for the 2005 season after a year in the First Division (Ykkönen).
They finished the 2005 season in 10th place, easily avoiding the relegation play-off (13th place) and direct relegation (14th place).

Season 2006
On 1 April 2006 KuPS beat reigning Veikkausliiga champions, MyPa 1–0 in the semi-final of the Finnish League Cup and secured a place in the Finnish League Cup Final. On 12 April 2006 in Finnair Stadium, Helsinki KuPS beat FC KooTeePee 2–1 in the League Cup Final and ended their 17-year run without titles. However, the club ended the 2006 season in last place, and was once again demoted to Ykkönen for the 2007 season. This resulted in manager Juha Malinen being replaced by his former player/assistant manager Kai Nyyssönen.

Reserve team, KuPS Akatemia (tr: KuPS Academy) played in the Second Division Group A (Kakkonen lohko A), but the team was terminated in December 2006 to cut costs and as a replacement, an agreement with Kings Kuopio, which plays also in the Second Division was signed.

In December 2006, it was revealed that the team was heavily in debt and about to go bankrupt. KuPS fans held their breath, until a Helsinki-based CEO of an Investment bank ICECAPITAL, also a former chairman of the Board of the Veikkausliiga, Ari Lahti increased his stake at the club to ca. 95% and saved the club.

Season 2007

After escaping imminent destruction, season 2007 began with reasonably low expectations. A target to achieve promotion back to top flight in two years was set.

Manager Kai Nyyssönen lured his former team-mate Harri Ylönen back to strengthen the team and to serve as an assistant manager. The duo lured in Roope Reinikainen, Ilja Venäläinen and Miikka Turunen, who also returned to their former home club.
Jussi Hakasalo from JJK Jyväskylä and Tero Mäkäläinen from MyPa were new names.

Because of relegation KuPS lost its prized assets, Sierraleonese players, Patrick Bantamoi to FC Inter Turku and Medo to HJK. KuPS and Ghanaian midfielder Seth Ablade parted their ways earlier, with Ablade terminating his contract.

Season 2007 started well with mostly local players. The team suffered a run of draws in the mid-season, but by winning their last six games with their main opponent RoPS of Rovaniemi at the same time losing its lead, KuPS won the league Ykkönen and went straight back. RoPS also achieved a promotion, by winning a promotion play-off against 13th-place finisher of Veikkausliiga, FC Viikingit.

2010-present
KuPS qualified for the UEFA Europa League after finishing second in the Veikkausliiga. They were drawn against Romanian side Gaz Metan Medias in the second qualifying round. Ilja Venäläinen gave KuPS a 1–0 lead going into the second leg in Romania, but the Finnish side fell 2–0 in Mediaș, ending their first European run in 21 years.

In the 2012-13 season, KuPS once again qualified for the Europa League. They beat Welsh side Llanelli in the first qualifying round, before pulling off a shock win against Maccabi Netanya. They fell in the next round to Turkish side Bursaspor, in what was the club's most successful European campaign ever.

KuPS solidified themselves as a mid-table Ykkonen side during the mid 2010s, and began to push for European places again towards the end of the decade, returning to the Europa League in the 2017 season, although their campaign ended almost immediately, with a loss to Copenhagen in the first round.

In the 2019 season KuPS won their first Finnish top-flight title since 1976. They played in the Champions League for the first time in their history next season.

European campaigns

UEFA club competition record
As of Septembar 17, 2022.

Season to season

Current squad
As of 18 July 2022.

Out on loan

Management
As of 1 October 2021

Boardroom
As of 28 September 2019

Honours
Mestaruussarja/Veikkausliiga
 Champions (6): 1956, 1958, 1966, 1974, 1976, 2019
 Runners-up (10): 1950, 1954, 1964, 1967, 1969, 1975, 1977, 1979, 2010, 2017, 2021, 2022

Finnish Cup
 Champions: 1968, 1989, 2021, 2022
 Runners-up: 2011, 2012, 2013

Finnish League Cup
 Champions: 2006

Ykkönen (second tier)
Champions: 2000, 2004, 2007

Kakkonen (third tier)
 Champions: 1998

Managers 

  Aaro Heikkinen (1945–57)
  Imre Nagy (1947)
  Martti Kosma (1958)
  Reino Miettinen (1959)
  Veijo Pehkonen (1960)
  Asser Väisänen (1960)
  Aaro Heikkinen (1961–65)
  Gunnar Boman (1966–68)
  Veikko Jokinen (1969–71)
  Unto Nevalainen (1969–71)
  Martti Räsänen (1972–79)
  Matti Terästö (initial term) (1980)
  Jarmo Flink (final season) (1980)
  Ari Savolainen (1981)
  Matti Väänänen (1982)
  Bogusław Hajdas (1983–85)
  Jouko Pasanen (1986)
  Jouko Pasanen (1987)
  Aarre Miettinen (July 1987)
  Heikki Turunen (1988)
  Aarre Miettinen (1988)
  Heikki Turunen (1989)
  Markku Hyvärinen (May 1989)
  Olavi Rissanen (May 1989)
  Martti Räsänen (1990–91)
  Olavi Rissanen (1990–91)
  Martti Räsänen (1992)
  Jouni Jäntti (Sept 1992)
  Markku Hyvärinen (Sept 1992)
  Keijo Voutilainen (Jan 1, 1993 – Dec 31, 1994)
  Hannu Turunen (1995–96)
  Atik Ismail (1995–96)
  Jouni Jäntti (1997–98)
  Ensio Pellikka (1998)
  Heikki Turunen (1999)
  Esa Pekonen (Jan 1, 2000 – Dec 31, 2001)
  Jari Pyykölä (Jan 1, 2002 – June 6, 2003)
  Ismo Lius (June 2003)
  Juha Malinen (Jan 1, 2005 – Dec 31, 2006)
  Kai Nyyssönen (Jan 1, 2007 – June 13, 2009)
  Esa Pekonen (June 14, 2009 – April 24, 2014)
  Marko Rajamäki (May 2, 2014 – 2016)
  Jani Honkavaara (2017–2019)
  Arne Erlandsen (2020)
  Simo Valakari (2021–2023)
  Pasi Tuutti (2023-present)

References

External links

Official website 
Banzai – Supporters of KuPS, club's website 

 
Association football clubs established in 1923
Football clubs in Finland
Kuopio
1923 establishments in Finland